Sandstone is a town in Pine County, Minnesota, United States, along the Kettle River. The population was 2,849 at the 2010 census.

Interstate 35 and Minnesota State Highways 18 and 23 are three of the main routes in the community.

Banning State Park is nearby.

History
The Village of Fortuna was platted by Caleb C. Ward and incorporated on May 19, 1857. It was originally platted at the junction of the Point Douglas to Superior Military Road and Kettle River. Fortuna served as the county seat for Buchanan County, Minnesota. By 1887, it had 200 residents. Just north of Fortuna, the Village of Sandstone was platted in June 1887 and incorporated on September 28, 1887. On April 14, 1920, the villages of Fortuna and Sandstone merged and reincorporated as the City of Sandstone.

The city's name in the Ojibwe language is Asiniikaaning ("At the quarrying place") due to the sandstone quarry at the edge of the city.

Geography

Features

Sandstone is on the Kettle River, known for its glacial kettles, and rapids well loved by kayakers and canoeists.  The town was built up around a large sandstone quarry. Railroad magnate James J. Hill built many of the sandstone structures in the town.

The city has Robinson Park, an historic and natural area that serves as a picnic area, hosts ice climbing in the winter, preserves the Sandstone Quarry history and is an access point for the Kettle River.

The Sandstone Ice Festival celebrates the coming of winter and is held in the beginning of December each year. The event welcomes winter with ice climbing, winter camping and snow shoeing. In the spring local paddlers host the Kettle River Paddle Festival, an event for canoeists and kayakers. A downriver race and a whitewater rodeo attract paddlers from all over the midwestern United States.

Sandstone is surrounded by Banning State Park, has a connection to the Munger Bicycle Trail and is home to the Audubon Center of the North Woods, a residential environmental education and conference facility that offers programs for schools, adults, colleges, and retreats.

In recent years, Sandstone has gained national recognition as the home of the Midwest Country Music Theatre. Performances at this traditional country and western music venue are seen regularly on the RFD-TV satellite network.

A Federal Correctional Institution rated for low-security federal inmates is two miles outside Sandstone.

Sandstone station served Great Northern Railway and Amtrak passenger trains until 1985.

Demographics

2010 census
As of the census of 2010, there were 2,849 people, 602 households, and 362 families living in the city. The racial makeup of the city was 71.5% White, 15.5% African American, 5.7% Native American, 0.6% Asian, 0.1% Pacific Islander, 3.6% from other races, and 2.9% from two or more races. Hispanic or Latino of any race were 11.0% of the population.

There were 602 households, of which 36.5% had children under the age of 18 living with them, 31.9% were married couples living together, 21.3% had a female householder with no husband present, 7.0% had a male householder with no wife present, and 39.9% were non-families. 33.2% of all households were made up of individuals, and 17.8% had someone living alone who was 65 years of age or older. The average household size was 2.42 and the average family size was 2.94.

The median age in the city was 34.9 years. 14.6% of residents were under the age of 18; 9.2% were between the ages of 18 and 24; 46.1% were from 25 to 44; 20.2% were from 45 to 64; and 9.8% were 65 years of age or older. The gender makeup of the city was 71.0% male and 29.0% female.

2000 census
As of the census of 2000, there were 1,549 people, 580 households, and 359 families living in the city. The racial makeup of the city was 94.84% White, 0.39% African American, 3.55% Native American, 0.32% Asian, 0.06% Pacific Islander, 0.39% from other races, and 0.45% from two or more races. Hispanic or Latino of any race were 1.42% of the population.

There were 580 households, out of which 30.3% had children under the age of 18 living with them, 44.5% were married couples living together, 13.4% had a female householder with no husband present, and 38.1% were non-families. 32.1% of all households were made up of individuals, and 16.4% had someone living alone who was 65 years of age or older. The average household size was 2.41 and the average family size was 3.03.

In the city, the population was spread out, with 24.9% under the age of 18, 8.0% from 18 to 24, 25.7% from 25 to 44, 17.4% from 45 to 64, and 24.0% who were 65 years of age or older. The median age was 38 years. For every 100 females, there were 79.1 males. For every 100 females age 18 and over, there were 73.6 males.

The median income for a household in the city was $40,265, and the median income for a family was $43,684. Males had a median income of $32,500 versus $21,181 for females. The per capita income for the city was $18,053. About 11.6% of families and 16.7% of the population were below the poverty line, including 24.4% of those under age 18 and 13.9% of those age 65 or over.

Notable people
Doug Carlson (1939–2013), veterinarian and politician
William S. Ervin, Attorney General of Minnesota
Yonassan Gershom (b. 1947), rabbi and author, early proponent of the Jewish Renewal movement

Education
The area is served by East Central Schools.

The Pine Grove Learning Center of the tribal Nay Ah Shing School is nearby and has a Sandstone address.

See also
Interstate Highway 35
Minnesota Highway 18
Minnesota Highway 23
Minnesota Highway 123

Notes

External links

Visit Sandstone MN – www.visitsandstonemn.com
Sandstone Ice Festival – www.sandstoneicefest.com
Kettle River Paddle Festival – www.kettleriverpaddlefest.com
Midwest Country Theater – www.midwestcountry.com

Cities in Pine County, Minnesota
Cities in Minnesota
Former county seats in Minnesota
1857 establishments in Minnesota Territory
Populated places established in 1857